Robert Lindley Murray (November 2, 1892 – January 17, 1970) was an American chemist and tennis player.

Early life

Robert Lindley Murray was born in San Francisco, California to Augustus Taber Murray and Nellie Howland Gifford. He graduated from Stanford University in 1913 with a degree in chemistry and received a chemical engineering master's degree the following year. Murray played for the varsity team and became the 1913 Pacific Coast intercollegiate champion.

Career
In 1961, Murray retired as the chairman of the Hooker Chemical Company.

Tennis
In June 1914, Murray won the New York Metropolitan title defeating Fred Alexander in the final in five sets, and in August, he won the Meadow Club Cup at Southampton, New York, beating Watson Washburn in the final in three straight sets.

Murray won his first national tennis title in February 1916 when he became the singles champion at the U.S. National Indoor Tennis Championships, played at the Seventh Regiment Armory in New York. In the final, he defeated Alrick Man in three sets 6–2, 6–2, 9–7.

He won the U.S. National Championship men's singles title in 1917 and 1918. The tournaments were renamed National Patriotic Tournaments in support of the war effort. No trophies were handed out to the winners, and the entrance fees were dedicated to the Red Cross. In 1917, Murray defeated Bostonian Nathaniel W. Niles in four sets. Murray did not intend to play the 1918 National Patriotic Tournament as his skills as chemical engineer were considered too important for him to play during wartime. Only after a lengthy effort to persuade him by Elon Hooker, the president of his company, did Murray consent to play. Despite little preparation, he managed to reach the final in which he faced Bill Tilden, the future seven-time champion. In an impressive performance, Murray easily defeated Tilden in three sets 6–3, 6–1, 7–5.

In the USLTA national rankings, he was the U.S. No. 1 in 1918, and was ranked fourth in 1914, 1916 and 1919.

Grand Slam finals

Singles (2 titles)

Personal life
Murray died on January 17, 1970, in Lewiston Heights, New York.

References

External links
 
 

1892 births
1970 deaths
American male tennis players
Tennis players from San Francisco
Stanford Cardinal men's tennis players
International Tennis Hall of Fame inductees
United States National champions (tennis)
Grand Slam (tennis) champions in men's singles